Roger M.  Breske (November 8, 1938 in Elderon, Wisconsin – April 3, 2012 in Weston, Wisconsin) was an American politician and businessman.

He served in the United States Army Reserves. He owned a tavern and restaurant.

Breske was the Wisconsin Railroad Commissioner, serving since 2008 until 2011. He was a Democratic member of the Wisconsin Senate, representing the 12th District from 1990 to 2008. He filed noncandidacy for the 2008 general election, and subsequently resigned to become Commissioner.

Notes

External links
 
12th Senate District, Senator Breske in the Wisconsin Blue Book (2005–2006)

1938 births
2012 deaths
Businesspeople from Wisconsin
People from Marathon County, Wisconsin
People from Shawano County, Wisconsin
Democratic Party Wisconsin state senators
Military personnel from Wisconsin
21st-century American politicians
20th-century American businesspeople
United States Army reservists